Charles Neil Newcombe (16 March 1891 – 27 December 1915) was an English cricketer and footballer who played first-class cricket for Derbyshire in 1910 and played for a number of football clubs, including Glossop, Chesterfield Town, Manchester United and Rotherham Town. He was killed in action in the First World War.

Newcombe was born in Great Yarmouth, the son of E. Percy G. Newcombe and Helen Ada L. Newcombe, later of Matlock. He was educated at Chesterfield School, where he was head boy.

Newcombe made a single first-class appearance for Derbyshire in the 1910 season against Yorkshire in May, when he hit wicket after 1 run in the first innings and was bowled out for a duck by Drake in the second. He was a right-handed batsman and a left-arm slow-medium bowler although he never bowled a first-class ball.

Newcombe began his football career at Sheepbridge Works before joining Creswell. He moved to Chesterfield Town ahead of the 1910/11 season and spent the following season there before moving to Rotherham Town. After a brief spell at Manchester United, he made two Football League appearances for Glossop during the 1913/14 season, before finishing his career at Tibshelf Colliery.

Newcombe served in the First World War with the 7th (Servicd) Battalion of the King's Own Yorkshire Light Infantry as a lieutenant and was killed in action at Fleurbaix in France. He was buried at Y Farm Military Cemetery, Bois-Grenier.

References

External links
Headstone photo
First World War Service Record

1891 births
1915 deaths
Military personnel from Norfolk
Burials in France
English cricketers
Derbyshire cricketers
King's Own Yorkshire Light Infantry officers
British Army personnel of World War I
British military personnel killed in World War I
Sportspeople from Great Yarmouth